Palacio de Congresos is a station of C-4 line of the suburban trains in the city of Seville, Andalusia. It is located in the intersection of Ciencias and Luis Uruñuela avenues, in the neighborhood of Sevilla Este. Palacio de Congresos is an elevated building situated between the Padre Pío and Santa Justa on the same line.

Metro (in planning phase) 
Is expected that by 2017, Palacio de Congresos will be a railway interchange station between suburban trains and metro services of line 2 of the Seville Metro, it will be located between the stations of Puerta Este and Ciencias on the same line, close to the current suburban trains station.

See also
 List of Seville metro stations

External links 
  Official site.
  Map of Line 2 project
 History, construction details and maps.

Cercanías Sevilla stations
Seville Metro stations
Railway stations in Andalusia